The nForce 600 chipset was released in the first half of November 2006, coinciding with the GeForce 8 series launch on November 8, 2006. The nForce 600 supports  Intel's LGA 775 socket and AMD's Quad FX platform and replaces the nForce 500 series.

AMD chipsets

nForce 680a SLI
Specially made for the AMD Quad FX platform proposed by AMD, providing a total of two CPUs and multiple graphic cards configuration (SLI) working on a single chipset.

AMD Dual Dual-core Socket F
Enthusiast multiple-GPU segment
Support for HyperTransport 2.0
2 northbridges as Media and Communications Processor (MCP) equal to that of nForce 570 SLI MCP, each providing one x16 and one x8 PCI-E lanes and total 28 PCI-E lanes
Total of 4 PCI-E x16 slots
Two of the x16 slots receive x8 PCI-E lanes bandwidth
Additional PCI-E slots support (PCI-E x8/x4/x1 slots)
Support of a total of 56 PCI-E lanes
PCI slot(s)
Support up to 4 non-registered DDR2 DIMM modules
Support for EPP memory
Support up to 12 SATA harddisks
Support RAID configurations:
 RAID 1
 RAID 0+1
 RAID 5
 JBOD
4 onboard Gigabit Ethernet ports
NVIDIA FirstPacket Technology
Support up to 20 USB 2.0 ports
Estimated price US$ 200 or more

nForce 630a

Socket 939/Socket AM2/Socket AM3 processors
Mainstream IGP segment
MCP61P northbridge, IGP renamed as GeForce 7050
sDVO connection for optional HDMI output 
DVI, TV-out outputs
1 PCI Express x16 slot
Extra PCIe x1 & PCI slots
High-definition audio (Azalia audio)
10 USB 2.0 ports
4 SATA 3.0 Gbit/s ports with RAID
Gigabit Ethernet

Intel chipsets

nForce 680i SLI
NVIDIA nForce 680i SLI System Platform Processors (SPPs) and Media Communications Processors (MCPs) are the top-of-the-line motherboard for Intel users in the nForce 600 series.

Support for Quad Core CPUs and 1333 MHz Front Side Bus
Support for 1200 MHz SLI-Ready Memory with EPP
Support for up to 46 PCI Express (PCIe) lanes
Support for up to 10 USB 2.0 ports
Support for 6 3 Gbit/s SATA and 2 PATA drives, which can be linked together in any combination of SATA and PATA to form a RAID 0, 1, 5, or 0+1
NVIDIA nTune, a tool for easy overclocking and timing configurations
HDA (Azalia) Audio
Dual Onboard Gigabit Ethernet
NVIDIA FirstPacket and DualNet

nForce 680i LT SLI

Support for Quad Core CPUs and 1333 MHz Front Side Bus
Support for 800 MHz SLI-Ready Memory with EPP
Support for up to 46 PCI Express (PCIe) lanes
Support for up to 10 USB 2.0 ports
Support for 6 3 Gbit/s SATA and 2 PATA drives, which can be linked together in any combination of SATA and PATA to form a RAID 0, 1, 5, or 0+1
NVIDIA nTune, a tool for easy overclocking and timing configurations
HDA (Azalia) Audio
Single Onboard Gigabit Ethernet
NVIDIA FirstPacket and DualNet

nForce 650i SLI
Intel LGA 775
Performance/mainstream dual-GPU segment
Estimated price US$150 or less

nForce 650i Ultra
Intel LGA 775
Performance/mainstream single-GPU segment
Estimated price US$150 or less

nForce 630i
Intel LGA 775
IGP
Single Channel DDR2 SDRAM memory
Video outputs: HDMI, DVI with HDCP and D-Sub
Value IGP segment
No PureVideo

nForce 680i SLI hotfix

NVIDIA has issued a fix named NV121906 in late December 2006 for 680i SLI motherboards. This hotfix was released because users have reported disconnect or write error issues with Serial ATA disk drives on their nForce 680i motherboards. It is an update specifically for SATA Disk Drives and system instability. System instability is observed in the following ways (not a complete list):

Random application shutdown
Corrupted boot drive
BSOD (Blue screen of death)
Corrupt data

To address them, BIOS updates were released for some NVIDIA nForce 680i SLI based motherboards that eliminate those symptoms. Affected motherboards include: 
EVGA nForce 680i SLI
BFG nForce 680i SLI
Biostar TF680i SLI Deluxe
ECS PN2-SLI2+

This update is supposed to improve system stability and prevent future stability issues related to SATA disk drives on those systems requiring this hotfix. NVIDIA has strongly recommended that all customers upgrade their motherboards to the newest available BIOS revision that their nForce 680i-based motherboards could support, regardless of whether or not they have experienced the issues. Also, NVIDIA has stated that this upgrade will preserve the user's current computer settings.

See also
 Comparison of Nvidia chipsets

References

External links 
DailyTech - More NVIDIA nForce 600 Series Details Revealed

Nvidia chipsets